Dmitry the Older or Dmitry of Bryansk (died on 12 August 1399 in the Battle of the Vorskla River) was the second eldest son of Algirdas, the Grand Duke of Lithuania, and his first wife Maria of Vitebsk. He was Duke of Bryansk from 1356 to 1379 and from 1388 to 1399.

In 1356, Algirdas took the region of Bryansk, which included Trubetsk and Starodub, from the Principality of Smolensk and granted to his son Dmitry to govern it. The territory was in far north east from the heartlands of the Grand Duchy of Lithuania and bordered the Grand Duchy of Moscow. In 1370, Dmitri Donskoi, the Grand Duke of Moscow, unsuccessfully attempted to conquer the territory. In 1372, Dmitry witnessed the Treaty of Lyubutsk between Algirdas and Dmitri Donskoi.

After his father's death in 1377, Dmitry supported his elder brother Andrei of Polotsk against their younger half-brother Jogaila, who became the Grand Duke of Lithuania. Andrei, believing that he is the rightful heir to the throne, organized an anti-Lithuanian coalition, which included Polotsk, Pskov, Livonian Order, and Grand Duchy of Moscow. Dmitry took a more passive role in the coalition: he did not wage a direct war against Lithuania and did not defend his domain when it was attacked by Moscow's army in 1379. Dmitry and his family followed the retreating Russian army into Moscow where Dmitri Donskoi granted him Pereslavl-Zalessky. In 1380, Dmitry led a Russian banner in the Battle of Kulikovo against the Golden Horde. Russian chronicles praise his and his brother's tactical skills.

After 1380, Dmitry is mentioned in written sources only twice. After his brother Andrei was captured by Skirgaila's forces and imprisoned in Poland, Dmitry reconciled with Jogaila, now King of Poland, in 1388. He returned to his former domain in Bryansk. Dmitry died in 1399 in the Battle of the Vorskla River against the Golden Horde.

Dmitry's son Michał Trubetsky is considered to be the ancestor of the Trubetskoy family.

References

1320s births
1399 deaths
Gediminids
Trubetskoy family